James Howard "Howdy" Caton (July 16, 1894 – January 8, 1948) was a professional baseball player.  He was a shortstop over parts of four seasons (1917–20) with the Pittsburgh Pirates.  For his career, he compiled a .226 batting average in 814 at-bats, with 53 runs batted in.

He was born and later died in Zanesville, Ohio at the age of 53.

External links

1894 births
1948 deaths
Pittsburgh Pirates players
Major League Baseball shortstops
Baseball players from Ohio
Portsmouth Cobblers players
Birmingham Barons players
Sportspeople from Zanesville, Ohio